Hari Shivdasani (1909–1994) was an Indian character actor in Hindi cinema from 1930s to 1980s.

Personal life
Hari Shivdasani was a Sindhi Hindu from Karachi and had moved with his family to Mumbai at the time of the partition of the British Raj in 1947. He was married to Barbara Shivdasani, a British Christian. The couple had two daughters. The eldest, Babita became a top actress, and is married to actor Randhir Kapoor, and the youngest, Meena Advani, is the owner of Powermaster Engineers Private Limited and Power-master tools Private Limited. The late actress Sadhana Shivdasani was his niece. His granddaughters, and daughters of Babita, are film actresses Karishma Kapoor and Kareena Kapoor. Kareena is married to actor Saif Ali Khan.

Shivdasani's acting career spanned over 50 years during which he appeared in more than 70 movies.

Filmography

Dadagiri (1987) [Actor]
Achha Bura (1983) [Actor .... Lala]
 Sun Meri Laila (1983) [Actor .... Mr. Shivdasani (Ad Film Producer)]
Sun Sajna (1982) [Actor .... Owner of Hotel Tin Min]
Yeh Vaada Raha (1982) [Actor .... Mr. Pannalal Saxena]
Harjaee (1981) [Actor .... Mr. Chopra]
Biwi O Biwi (1981) [Actor .... Col. Hari Singh]
Laawaris (1981) [Actor .... Sethji]
Professor Pyarelal (1981) [Actor .... Rai's creditor]
Khwab (1980) [Actor .... Judge]
 Raadha Aur Seeta (1979) [Actor .... Dholuram's boss] 
 Jhoota Kahin Ka (1979) [Actor .... Faujiram] 
 Satyam Shivam Sundaram: Love Sublime (1978) [Actor .... Chief Engineer] 
Vishwanath (1978) [Actor .... Raj Kishan Mehta]
 Khel Khilari Ka (1977) [Actor .... I.G.P.] 
 Chacha Bhatija (1977) [Actor .... Pinky's Father] (uncredited) 
Bhanwar (1976) [Actor .... Real Bridegroom's father]
 Khalifa (1976) [Actor .... Shyamsunder Aswani] 
 Zameer (1975) [Actor .... Hari Shivdasani (Auction winner)] 
 Khel Khel Mein (1975) [Actor .... Vikram's Father] 
 Sanyasi (1975) [Actor .... Family Advocate] 
 Ajnabee (1974) [Actor .... Diwan Sardarilal] 
 Insaaniyat (1974) [Actor .... Poonamchand] 
 Daag: A Poem of Love (1973) [Actor .... Jagdish Kapoor] 
 Sone Ke Haath (1973) [Actor] 
 Ek Hasina Do Diwane (1972) [Actor] 
 Jeet (1972) [Actor] (uncredited) 
 Kab? Kyoon? Aur Kahan? (1970) [Actor .... Police Superintendent Gupta] 
 Pehchan (1970) [Actor .... Ashram Manager] (uncredited)
 Anjaana (1969) [Actor .... Advocate] 
 Doli (1969) [Actor .... College Director] 
 Ek Shriman Ek Shrimati (1969) [Actor .... Doctor] 
Kismat (1969) [Actor .... Roma's Dad]
 Talash (1969) [Actor .... Babulal (Lachchu's Father)] 
 Tumse Achha Kaun Hai (1969) [Actor .... Announcer] 
 Aulad (1968) [Actor .... Major Gupta] 
 Haseena Maan Jayegi (1968) [Actor .... Barrister. Randhir (Raakesh's Father)] 
 Jhuk Gaya Aasman (1968) [Actor .... B.K.] 
 Hamraaz (1967) [Actor .... General]  ... aka "Confidant" - USA (informal English title) 
 Dus Lakh (1966) [Actor .... Corrupt building contractor] 
 Waqt (1965) [Actor .... Lala Hardiyal Rai - Kedarnath's friend] 
 Arzoo (1965) [Actor .... Major Kapoor] 
 Bheegi Raat (1965) [Actor .... Colonel Bhim Singh] 
 Neela Aakash (1965) [Actor]  45.Rajkumar (1964) [Actor]  .. aka "Raaj Kumar" - USA (DVD box title) 
 Ganga Ki Lahren (1964) [Actor .... Seth. Laxmi Das] 
 Ishaara (1964) [Actor .... Madan Rais] 
 Sangam (1964/I) [Actor .... Captain] 
 Dil Hi To Hai (1963) [Actor .... Nawab Jallaudin] 
 Yeh Rastey Hain Pyar Ke (1963) [Actor .... Rai Bahadur Gyanchand Sahni] 
 Asli-Naqli (1962) [Actor]
 Anuradha (1961) [Actor .... Brijeshwar Prasad Roy] 
 Mem-Didi (1961) [Actor .... Dilip's Father] 
 Mr. India (1961) [Actor .... Rai Bahadur Himmatchand] 
 Parakh (1960) [Actor .... School's Principal] 
 Dil Bhi Tera Hum Bhi Tere (1960) [Actor .... Memsaab's Father] 
 Hum Hindustani (1960) [Actor .... Diwan] 
 Love in Simla (1960) [Actor .... Announcer] 
 Bhai-Bahen (1959) [Actor]  ... aka "Blackmailer" - India (English title) 
 Black Cat (1959) [Actor .... Commissioner of Police] (uncredited) 
 Chhoti Bahen (1959) [Actor .... Ramesh's dad] (as Hari Sivadasani) 
 Kal Hamara Hai (1959) [Actor] (as H. Shivdasani)
 12 O'Clock (1958) [Actor .... Bali's mamaji] (as Hari Sivdasani) 
 Ab Dilli Dur Nahin (1957) [Actor .... Public Prosecutor] 
 Shree 420 (1955) [Actor .... Philachand] 
 Marine Drive (1955) [Actor .... Sunderlal Khanna] 
 Badshah (1954) [Actor] 
 Baghdad (1952) [Actor] 
 Panchhi (1944) [Actor] 
 Kisise Na Kehna (1942) [Actor] 
 Hindustan Hamara (1940) [Actor .... Chunilal] 
 Main Hari (1940) [Actor] 
 Prem Ratri (1936) [Actor] 
 Sangdil Samaj (1936) [Actor] 
 Sher Ka Panja (1936) [Actor] 
 Bharat Ki Beti (1935) [Actor] 
 Dharma Ki Devi (1935) [Actor]

References

External links
 
 

Sindhi people
1909 births
1994 deaths
Indian male film actors
Male actors in Hindi cinema
20th-century Indian male actors